Kieran Collins (born 14 December 1997) is a former Australian rules footballer who played for the Western Bulldogs in the Australian Football League (AFL). He was drafted by the Western Bulldogs with their second selection and twenty-sixth overall in the 2015 national draft. He made his debut in the twenty-five point loss against  in round 9, 2016 at the Spotless Stadium.

Collins was delisted at the end of 2018.  He signed to play with the Northern Blues in the Victorian Football League in 2019.

References

External links

1997 births
Living people
People educated at Haileybury (Melbourne)
Western Bulldogs players
Dandenong Stingrays players
Preston Football Club (VFA) players
Australian rules footballers from Victoria (Australia)